Fernando Miranda Zóbel de Ayala  (born March 14, 1960) is a Filipino businessman. He served as president (2006-2022) and chief executive officer (2021-2022) of Ayala Corporation.

Education 
Zóbel attended Ladycross School for his preparatory studies and graduated from Harvard College with a Bachelor of Arts degree in 1982. He also completed a Certificate in International Management at INSEAD in France.

Career 
Zóbel served as chairman of Ayala Land, Inc., Manila Water Company, Inc., AC International Finance Ltd., Ayala International Pte Ltd., Ayala DBS Holdings, Inc., Alabang Commercial Corporation, AC Energy Holdings, Inc., and Hero Foundation, Inc; co-chairman of the Ayala Foundation, Inc.; co-vice chairman of Mermac, Inc.; director of the Bank of the Philippine Islands, Globe Telecom, Integrated Micro-Electronics, Inc. (IMI), LiveIt Investments, Ltd., Asiacom Philippines, Inc., AG Holdings Limited, Ayala International Holdings Limited, AI North America, Inc., Vesta Property Holdings Inc., Honda Cars Philippines, Inc., Isuzu Philippines Corporation, Pilipinas Shell Petroleum Corp., and Manila Peninsula.

Other activities 
He sits on the boards of various international and local business and socio-civic organizations:

International 
Chairman, Habitat for Humanity  Asia-Pacific Capital Campaign Steering Committee
Vice Chairman, Habitat for Humanity International
Member, The Asia Society
Member, World Economic Forum
Member, INSEAD East Asia Council
Member, World Presidents' Organization

Local 
Chairman, HERO Foundation, Inc.
Trustee, Caritas Manila
Trustee, Pilipinas Shell Foundation
Trustee, Kapit Bisig para sa Ilog Pasig Advisory Board
Trustee, National Museum of the Philippines

Personal life 
Zóbel is married to Catherine Silverio, daughter of former PBA coach Dante Silverio. They have four children.

Honors

 Philippine Legion of Honor, Rank of Grand Commander (June 29, 2010).

References

External links
 Ayala Corporation

1960 births
20th-century Filipino businesspeople
Filipino people of German descent
Filipino people of Spanish descent
Filipino people of Basque descent
Fernando
Living people
People educated at Worth School
People from Ermita
Businesspeople from Metro Manila
Harvard College alumni
Chief operating officers
INSEAD alumni
21st-century Filipino businesspeople